Líneas Aéreas de Guinea Ecuatorial (LAGE) was the national airline of Equatorial Guinea. It had its headquarters in Malabo.

History
The carrier was created as the national airline of Equatorial Guinea in 1970, after the country's independence. From Bata, the airline served Douala, Libreville and Malabo with a fleet of Convair 440s leased from Iberia. LAGE ceased operations in 1979, following the withdrawal of these aircraft from service.

See also
List of airlines of Equatorial Guinea
 List of defunct airlines of Equatorial Guinea

References

Defunct airlines of Equatorial Guinea
Airlines established in 1970
Airlines disestablished in 1979
1970 establishments in Africa
1979 disestablishments in Africa